The Adkins–Peterson reaction is the air oxidation of methanol to formaldehyde with metal oxide catalysts such as iron oxide,  molybdenum trioxide or combinations thereof.

It was developed by Homer Burton Adkins and Wesley R. Peterson.

References 

Organic redox reactions
Name reactions